Kawana Waters State College (KWSC) is a Prep to Year Twelve (K–12) college in Kawana Waters between Mooloolaba and Caloundra on the Sunshine Coast, Queensland, Australia, approximately 100 km north of Brisbane. The campus is next to Lake Kawana.

The college is the result of a merger between the Grade 7 to Grade 12 Kawana Waters State High School with the primary-to-Year Seven school Bokarina State School in 2006.

Kawana Waters State High School was the original building, built in 1986, with Bokarina State School being built in 1987.

Curriculum 

KWSC consists of a Junior, Middle and High School campus. Kawana Waters State College has an extensive range of subject offerings including Overall Position (OP) and vocational education.

Facilities 

KWSC is near Wurtulla Beach and Lake Kawana. Sport related events are held in these areas.

References

External links

Public high schools in Queensland
Kawana Waters, Queensland
Schools on the Sunshine Coast, Queensland
Educational institutions established in 1986
1986 establishments in Australia